Sułów  is a village (former city) in the administrative district of Gmina Milicz, within Milicz County, Lower Silesian Voivodeship, in south-western Poland. Prior to 1945 it was in Germany.

Geography

The village has a population of 1,600.

History
A first Sułów Castle, built by the Silesian Dukes of Oels was mentioned in 1351. Later a base of robber barons, it was finally destroyed by Wrocław citizens about 1500. The preserved Baroque Castle with gardens was erected in the late 17th century. From 1775 until the end of World War II, Sulau held town privileges.

Sułów is known for its two timber framed churches, Sts Peter and Paul built in 1731-34 and Our Lady of Czestochowa erected in 1765–67.

The Tarczyński Group meat produce company was founded in Sułów in 1989 by Jacek Tarczyński.

References

Villages in Milicz County
Former populated places in Lower Silesian Voivodeship